Galaxy Television may refer to:
 Galaxy Television (Nigeria)
 Galaxy (Australian television), a former cable television and satellite television company in Australia
 Galaxy (British television), the Galaxy Channel operated by British Satellite Broadcasting

See also
 Galaxy (disambiguation)